The Committee for a Responsible Federal Budget (CRFB) is a non-profit public policy organization based in Washington, D.C. that addresses federal budget and fiscal issues.  It was founded in 1981 by former United States Representatives Robert Giaimo (D-CT)  and Henry Bellmon (R-OK), and its board of directors includes former Members of Congress and directors of the Office of Management and Budget, the Congressional Budget Office and the Federal Reserve.

History 
The organization was founded by former Representative and Chairman of the House Budget Committee Robert Giaimo (D-CT) and former Representative and Ranking Budget Committee member Henry Bellmon (R-OK) on June 10, 1981.  After leaving Congress, the two decided that the country needed an organization outside of government committed to advocating for sound budget process, and decided to convene a group including other former Budget Committee Chairmen, former Directors of the Office of Management and Budget, leading economists, and businessmen.

In the 1990s, the CRFB formed the Cost Containment Coalition, led by then-president Cox, to find a solution to what some had termed a health care crisis. This coalition was later criticized for receiving funding from Philip Morris and the Tobacco Institute. The Coalition lobbied against an excise tax on tobacco under consideration by the Clinton administration.

CRFB was also host of the Peterson-Pew Commission on Budget Reform, which released its initial report, "Red Ink Rising," in December 2009 and its second report, "Getting Back in the Black," in November 2010.

Leadership 
The committee's first president was Carol Cox Wait, who served until 2003 and remained on CRFB's board of directors. Wait was succeeded by Maya MacGuineas, who also served as Director of the Fiscal Policy Program at the New America Foundation. In July 2015, CRFB announced Mitch Daniels, Leon Panetta and Timothy Penny as the new co-chairs of its board. CRFB's board of directors was previously co-chaired by William Frenzel (R-MN), Timothy Penny (I-MN), and Charles Stenholm (D-TX), all former Congressional representatives.

The organization's activities are overseen by a 40-member board of directors composed of experts and prominent figures in federal budget, tax and fiscal policy.

A large part of the board is composed of former directors of major budget-related government offices including the Congressional Budget Office (CBO), the Office of Management and Budget (OMB), the House and Senate Budget Committees, and the Federal Reserve Board of Governors.  The group also includes numerous former Congressmen, former U.S. Comptrollers General, university and think tank experts on fiscal policy, and prominent members of the business and legal community.

Research and publications 

The Committee focuses on many issues including deficit reduction, entitlement reform, fundamental tax reform, improving the budget process, and other topical issues as they arise.

In the past, CRFB has produced analyses in areas including:
 A detailed summary and cost estimate of the Coronavirus Aid, Relief, and Economic Security (CARES) Act, and an infographic visualizing how the money will be spent
 The stages in the annual federal budget cycle (e.g., the President's budget submission, Congressional Budget Resolution, explainers on appropriations, government shutdowns, etc.)
 Developments and changes in Congressional budget procedures and process, such as an appropriations tracker
 The status and future prospects of long-term government “entitlement” programs (e.g., Medicare, Medicaid, and Social Security)
 The findings of regular financial and budgetary reports put out by government offices (e.g., the Congressional Budget Office's “Monthly Budget Report,” the “Budget and Economic Outlook],” and the Long-Term Budget Outlook.")
 Tax and spending bills proposed by Congress or the President
 The costs of the candidates’ campaign promises during the 2008, 2012, 2016, and 2020 Presidential Elections, including an analysis of 2020 candidate health care plans
 The fiscal implications of the government's actions during the Economic and Financial Crisis of 2008–2009
 Major public policy initiatives (e.g., health care reform), including an illustrative stimulus plan, and a list of budget offsets that can produce savings].

The organization also issues regular press releases on day-to-day news developments related to federal budget, tax, and fiscal policy.

Based at the New America Foundation 
From 2004 through 2013, the organization was based at the New America Foundation, a non-profit, non-partisan, Washington, D.C.-area public policy “think tank.”  Republican Maya MacGuineas, President of CRFB, was also the Program Director of New America's Fiscal Policy Program, and most of CRFB's staff were also co-appointed to positions at New America. As of January 2014 the organization no longer has ties with the New America Foundation.

Projects and initiatives

US Budget Watch
In 2008, the organization received a grant from the Pew Charitable Trusts to raise the public understanding of important fiscal matters facing the country during the 2008 election. This project, called US Budget Watch, was also tasked with tracking the candidates’ tax and spending promises both during and after the election.

The project's most high-profile contribution to the public debate was its series of “Voter Guides,” which attempted to tabulate the costs of then-Senator Barack Obama's and Senator John McCain's campaign promises. The project's "Promises, Promises: A Fiscal Voter Guide to the 2008 Election" was widely cited in the mainstream media during the campaign. CNN called it “the most detailed analysis of McCain's and Obama's budget plans.".

In February 2012, US Budget Watch released a report assessing the debt impact of the campaign proposals from the Republican presidential candidates. The study was preceded by a publication laying out “The 12 Principles of Fiscal Responsibility for the 2012 Campaign.”

Efforts in the 2016 presidential campaign included a report comparing the fiscal impact of the policy proposals from Donald Trump and Hillary Clinton, titled "Promises and Pricetags." Data from the project was cited in several debates.

US Budget Watch 2020 has published explainers on candidates' proposals and fact-checked their statements related to fiscal policy, as well as compared candidate healthcare plans. It also produced an analysis comparing the campaign proposals of President Trump and Vice President Biden.

Budget Process Reform
In late 2008, CRFB received support from The Peter G. Peterson Foundation and the Pew Charitable Trusts to create a new commission that would explore options for reforming the federal budget process, the Peterson-Pew Commission on Budget Reform. Initially, the commission was directed by Jim Bates, former Chief Counsel and Staff Director of the U.S. House Committee on the Budget, and former Associate Director of Energy, Natural Resources, Agriculture, & Science at the Office of Management and Budget. F. Steven Redburn, a former senior official in the U.S. Office of Management and Budget, directed the project in 2010 and 2011. The project completed its work in 2011 and was succeeded by the Better Budget Process Initiative.

The Better Budget Process Initiative was created in 2014 to fix the broken budget process through concrete ideas to reform and improve the way the budget is developed. Publications produced by the initiative include principles for a budget resolution and budget baseline reforms.

FixUS
FixUS was formally launched in 2020. According to its website: "FixUS is a group of Americans united in shared concern over the divided state of our country. We believe that healing these divisions is our highest national priority, and essential to preparing our nation to face the defining challenges of the 21st century."

FixUS conducted a national Roadshow and Listening Tour to discuss the division and dysfunction plaguing our politics. It produced a report with findings.

Campaign to Fix the Debt

The Campaign to Fix the Debt was launched in July 2012, and has advocated for deficit reduction (including cuts to Social Security and Medicare) and tax reform to avoid a fiscal cliff. In 2012, former Democrat Erskine Bowles and former Republican Senator Alan Simpson served as co-chairs, while former Pennsylvania Gov. Ed Rendell and former Senator Judd Gregg served as steering committee co-chairs.

SSDI Solutions Initiative
The McCrery-Pomeroy SSDI Solutions Initiative was launched in 2014 to identify “practical policy changes to improve the Social Security Disability Insurance (SSDI) program and other policies for people with disabilities.” It was co-chaired by former Congressmen Earl Pomeroy (D-ND) and Jim McCrery (R-LA), both former Chairmen of the House Ways & Means Social Security Subcommittee.

The initiative published a book, SSDI Solutions: Ideas to Strengthen the Social Security Disability Insurance Program, in 2016 based on papers commissioned from various policy experts. It published several more commissioned papers in 2018 and 2019.

Go Big

CRFB launched the Go Big initiative after The Budget Control Act of 2011, enacted in early August to raise the debt-ceiling and avoid default, tasked a bipartisan 12-member Joint Congressional Committee on Deficit Reduction (Super Committee) with finding an additional $1.5 trillion in deficit reduction by November 23. For this reason, CRFB launched "Go Big" in an effort to urge the Super Committee to exceed its savings mandate of $1.5 trillion and enact a bipartisan, comprehensive fiscal reform plan.

Moment of Truth Project
In early 2011, former fiscal commission co-chairs Erskine Bowles and Alan Simpson launched the Moment of Truth Project, a non-profit, non-partisan effort that seeks to foster honest discussion about the nation's fiscal challenges, the difficult choices that must be made to solve them, and the potential for bipartisan compromise that can move the debate forward and set our country on a sustainable path. The Moment of Truth project aims to use the Fiscal Commission's findings to spark a national discussion on the need to implement a comprehensive budget fix, and to help further develop the policy reforms ideas to improve the nation's fiscal outlook.

Stimulus.org
In early 2009, CRFB unveiled Stimulus.org, a database which tracked the spending and deficit impact of all major government actions taken in response to the economic and financial crisis.

On the April 5, 2009 edition of CBS’ Face the Nation, host Bob Schieffer used figures from CRFB's “Stimulus Watch” chart while questioning Treasury Secretary Timothy Geithner about the amount of Troubled Asset Relief Program (TARP) funds that remained unspent.

Fiscal Roadmap Project
CRFB's "Fiscal Roadmap Project" was an initiative seeking to outline how the U.S. can move from stabilizing the economy during financial crisis to addressing its long-term fiscal problems. The ultimate goal of the project was to show how policymakers can eventually put the country in what CRFB regards as a sounder fiscal position. The project released at least two long analyses, one on deficits  and another on the activities of the Federal Reserve during the economic and financial crisis of 2007-2008. The Fiscal Roadmap project was originally directed by Anne Vorce, former U.S. economic expert for the European Commission.

Interactive tools
CRFB has created several interactive tools to create a better understanding of the fiscal challenges facing the country and the choices required to address them. The "COVID Money Tracker" tool was launched in 2020 to track federal spending in response to the COVID-19 pandemic.

The “Stabilize the Debt” online budget simulator was launched in 2010 and challenged the user to reduce the national debt to 60% of the economy in the medium term and put it on a declining course thereafter with a variety of options available from all parts of the federal budget. It was replaced by the "Debt Fixer" tool in 2017. Results are occasionally compiled and analyzed to highlight trends in public support for specific deficit reduction ideas. “The Reformer: An Interactive Tool to Fix Social Security” offers options to improve Social Security and put its finances on a sustainable path.

Prominent past and current board members 
Barry Anderson, former acting Director of the Congressional Budget Office (CBO)
Roy Ash, former OMB Director for Nixon and Ford administrations
Nancy Kassebaum Baker, former U.S. Senator from Kansas
Henry Bellmon, former Governor of Oklahoma and U.S. Senator from Oklahoma and co-founder of CRFB
Erskine Bowles, former co-chairmen of the National Commission on Fiscal Responsibility and Reform
Charles Bowsher, former Comptroller General of GAO under Reagan administration
Kent Conrad, former Chairman of the Senate Budget Committee
Dan Crippen, former CBO Director from 1999 to 2003
Mitch Daniels, former OMB Director and Governor of Indiana
Dick Darman, former OMB Director under George H.W. Bush administration
Vic Fazio, former U.S. Representative from California
William Frenzel, former U.S. Representative from Minnesota
Bill Gradison Jr., former U.S. Representative from Ohio
William H. Gray III, former U.S. Representative from Pennsylvania
Alan Greenspan, former Chairman of the Federal Reserve
Jane Harman, former U.S. Representative from California
William Hoagland, former Staff Director of the Senate Budget Committee
Douglas Holtz-Eakin, former Director of CBO, economic advisor to McCain 2008 presidential campaign
James R. Jones, former Chief of Staff to Lyndon Johnson
Lou Kerr, President and Chair of the Kerr Foundation
Jim Kolbe, former U.S. Representative from Arizona
James Lynn, former Director of OMB
Marjorie Margolies, former U.S. Representative from Pennsylvania
Dave McCurdy, former U.S. Representative from Oklahoma
James T. McIntyre, former Director of the OMB
David Minge, former U.S. Representative from Minnesota
Jim Nussle, former Director of OMB under George W. Bush
Paul O'Neill, former Secretary of the Treasury under George W. Bush
June E. O'Neill, former Director of CBO
Marne Obernaurer Jr., Chairman of the Beverage Distributors Company
Robert Packwood, former Chairman of the Senate Finance Committee 
Leon Panetta, former OMB Director and Director of the Central Intelligence Agency
Rudolph Penner, former CBO Director
Timothy Penny, former U.S. Representative from Minnesota
Peter G. Peterson, former U.S. Secretary of Commerce and founder of Peter G. Peterson Foundation
Robert Reischauer, former Director of CBO and current President of the Urban Institute
John J. Rhodes, former U.S. Representative from Arizona
Alice Rivlin, founding Director of CBO, former member of Federal Reserve Board of Governors
Charles Robb, former U.S. Senator from Virginia
Martin Sabo, former Chairman of the House Budget Committee
Charles Schultze, former Chairman of the Council of Economic Advisers
Alan K. Simpson, former Republican Senator from Wyoming 
John W. Snow, former Secretary of the Treasury under George W. Bush
John Spratt, former House Budget Committee Chairman
Elmer Staats, former U.S. Comptroller General
Charles Stenholm, former U.S. Representative from Texas
Eugene Steuerle, Senior Fellow at the Urban Institute
David Stockman, former Director of OMB under Reagan, former U.S. Representative from Michigan
Robert Strauss, former Chairman of Democratic National Committee
Lawrence Summers, former Treasury Secretary and Director of the National Economic Council
John Tanner, former U.S. Representative from Tennessee
Tom Tauke, former U.S. Representative from Iowa
Laura Tyson, former Chair of the White House Council of Economic Advisers
George Voinovich, former U.S. Senator from Ohio
Paul Volcker, former Chairman of the Federal Reserve
Carol Cox Wait, former President of CRFB
David Walker, former U.S. Comptroller General and Director of GAO
Joseph R. Wright, former Director of OMB under Ronald Reagan
Janet Yellen, current United States Secretary of the Treasury

See also 
 Fiscal responsibility
  United States federal budget
  United States public debt
  PAYGO

References

External links 
 Committee for a Responsible Federal Budget

Nonpartisan organizations in the United States
Non-profit organizations based in Washington, D.C.
Organizations established in 1981
Political and economic think tanks in the United States